The FA WSL Spring Series was an interim edition of the FA WSL between the sixth and seventh full seasons. The Spring Series ran from February to May 2017 to bridge the gap from the 2016 FA WSL season which ran from March to September as a summer tournament, and the 2017–18 season which started in September 2017.

While the 2017–18 season planned to feature 21 clubs, the Spring Series contained 20. Notts County Ladies F.C. folded two days before they were due to play their first Spring Series game, leaving 19 teams in total. Teams played each other once, with no promotion or relegation before the full 2017–18 season. WSL 2 began in February, while WSL 1 started in April.

Teams
WSL 1

WSL 2

WSL 1

Ten teams were due to compete in this season. Notts County Ladies announced it was folding and withdrew from the league two days before their first scheduled fixture.

Table

Results

Top goalscorers

WSL 2

Ten teams competed in this season. Brighton & Hove Albion was promoted after beating Sporting Club Albion in the 2015–16 FA Women's Premier League Championship play-off. Following the closure of Notts County Ladies in April 2017, one team was promoted at the end of the Spring Series to the WSL1 for the 2017–18 season, based on an evaluation by the FA of applicant clubs' business plans, budget, youth development, facilities and on-pitch performance.

Table

Results

Top goalscorers

References

2017
1
2016–17 domestic women's association football leagues